Lawson is often an English and Scottish surname that may sometimes also be a given name.

Creative professionals

Actors
 Ben Lawson (born 1980), Australian actor
 Bianca Lawson, American actress
 Charles Lawson, Belfast actor
 Denis Lawson, Scottish actor
 Jayme Lawson, American actress
 Maggie Lawson, American actress
 The Lawson family (Ted, Joan, Vicki, Jamie), a fictional family from Small Wonder (TV series)

Artists
 Adelaide Lawson (1889–1986), American artist
 Cecil Gordon Lawson, English landscape painter
 Louise Lawson (1860s–1899), American sculptor
 Nigella Lawson, writer and cook
 Jim Lawson (comics) (born 1960), American comic book artist
 Jordan Lawson, actor and musician from The Flys (US band)
Kenneth Lawson (artist) (1920-2008), English artist and set designer

Journalists
 Dominic Lawson, British journalist; brother of Nigella, son of Nigel
 Mark Lawson, British journalist, broadcaster and author
 Neal Lawson, British political commentator and writer
 Sylvia Lawson (1932–2017), Australian journalist, academic and author
 W. R. Lawson William Ramage Lawson (1840–1922), British journalist, economics writer

Writers
 Henry Lawson, Australian writer and poet
 Joan Lawson (1907–2002), English ballet dancer and writer
 Louisa Lawson, Australian poet, writer, publisher, suffragist, feminist, and mother of Henry Lawson
 Shayla Lawson, American writer and poet
 Will Lawson (1876—1957), Australian writer and poet

Educators
 Abercrombie Lawson (1870–1927), Canadian-born professor of botany in Australia
 Andrew Lawson, professor of geology, University of California, author of report on the 1906 San Francisco earthquake

Politicians
 Al Lawson, Florida state senator
 B.J. Lawson (William Lawson, born 1974), 2008 Republican Party nominee in North Carolina
 James Earl Lawson (politician) (1891–1950), Canadian politician and lawyer
 Harry Lawson (politician) (1875–1952), premier of Victoria, Australia
 Jack Lawson (1881–1965), British trade unionist and Labour politician
 Nigel Lawson, British Conservative politician and Chancellor of the Exchequer 1983–1989
 Peter Lawson, Canadian Member of Parliament
 Ray Lawson, Canadian industrialist, Lieutenant Governor of Ontario
 Terra Lawson-Remer, American politician, economist, and professor
 Tom Lawson, Green Party candidates, 2004 Canadian federal election#Tom Lawson (Prince Edward—Hastings)
Valarie Lawson (born 1966), American politician

Scientists
 H. Blaine Lawson, American mathematician
 Harry John Lawson, British engineer and motor industry pioneer
 Isaac Lawson (died 1747), Scottish physician, friend of Linnaeus
 Marmaduke Alexander Lawson (1840–1896), British botanist

Sportspeople
 Alex Lawson, American tennis player
 Bob Lawson, American baseball player
 Carl Lawson (American football) (born 1994), American football player
 Dedric Lawson (born 1997), American basketball player
 Dillon Lawson, American baseball coach
 Eddie Lawson, motorcycle racer
 Henry Lawson (cricketer) (1865–1941), New Zealand cricketer
 Jermaine Lawson, West Indian Test Cricketer
 Jim Lawson (American football) (1902–1989), college and professional football player
 Jim Lawson (sports executive), Canadian businessman and lawyer, with Canadian Football League and Jockey Club of Canada
 Jimmy Lawson (born 1947), English professional footballer
 Jimmy Lawson (footballer) (1886–1962), Scottish footballer (Dundee FC) and later golfer in the USA
 Kara Lawson (born 1981), American former professional basketball player and television analyst, assistant coach for the Boston Celtics
 Patricia Lawson (1929–2019), Canadian multi-sport athlete and coach
 Tom Lawson (ice hockey) (born 1979), Canadian ice hockey player

Other
 Alfred Lawson, 20th century American aviator, reformer, utopian and religious leader
 Charlie Lawson, American mass murderer
 Gaines Lawson, American Civil War Medal of Honor recipient
Kenneth Lawson, law professor and former lawyer
 Len Lawson (1927–2003), Australian comic book creator, rapist and murderer
 Theresa Lawson (1951–2014), Australian convicted of embezzlement

Similar names
 Edward Lawson (disambiguation), several people, including
 Edward C. Lawson, African-American civil rights activist
 Edward M. Lawson, Canadian senator
 Ellie Lawson , UK Singer Songwriter
 Geoff Lawson (disambiguation), several people, including
 Geoff Lawson (cricketer) (born 1957), Australian cricketer
 Geoff Lawson (designer) (1944–1999), British car designer
 James Lawson (disambiguation), several people, including
 James Lawson (activist) (born 1928), nonviolence tactician in the American Civil Rights Movement
 James Lawson (Australian doctor) (born 1934), Australian public health doctor and scientist
 James Lawson (footballer) (born 1987), English professional footballer
 James Lawson (swimmer) (born 1995), Zimbabwean swimmer
 James Anthony Lawson (1817–1887), judge of Queen's Bench, Ireland
 James Earl Lawson, Canadian Member of Parliament
 James Gilchrist Lawson (1874–1946), British Christian author and compiler
 James Lawson Drummond (1783–1853), Irish physician, naturalist and botanist
 James R. Lawson (1918–1985), American anti-Imperialist activist and black nationalist
 James Raymond Lawson (1915–1996), African-American physicist and president of Fisk University
 Jeff Lawson (disambiguation), several people, including
 Jeff Lawson, co-founder of distributed.net
 Jeff Lawson, co-founder and CEO of twilio
 Jeff Lawson (footballer) (born 1944), Australian rules footballer
 Jerry Lawson (disambiguation), several people, including 
 Jerry Lawson (engineer) (1940–2011), American electronic engineer 
 Jerry Lawson (musician) (1944–2019), American singer and music producer 
 Jerry Lawson (runner) (born 1966), American long-distance runner
 John Lawson (disambiguation), several people, including
 John Lawson (Australian politician) (1897–1956)
 John Lawson (Australian rules footballer) (born 1883), Australian rules footballer for Collingwood, St Kilda and Richmond
 John Lawson (children's author) (1923–1993), also known as John S. "Jack" Lawson, of New York and Virginia
 John Lawson (cyclist) (1872–1902), Swedish cycling champion
 John Lawson (explorer) (1674–1711), English explorer in colony of North Carolina
 John Lawson (footballer) (1925–1990), English footballer
 John Lawson (naval officer) (c. 1615–1665), English Naval Officer and Republican
 John Lawson (Medal of Honor) (1837–1919), U.S. Navy sailor
 John D. Lawson (politician) (1816–1896), U.S. Representative from New York
 John D. Lawson (scientist) (1923–2008), British plasma physicist, developed Lawson criterion
 John Howard Lawson (1894–1977), American writer
 Sir John Grant Lawson, 1st Baronet (1856–1919), British Unionist politician 
 John K. Lawson (1886–1941), Senior Canadian officer during the Battle of Hong Kong, World War II
 John K. Lawson (artist) (born 1962), British-American artist
 John Parker Lawson (died 1852), clergyman of the Episcopal Church of Scotland and historian
 John R. Lawson (died 1945), Colorado union leader
 John W. Lawson (1837–1905), U.S. Representative from Virginia
 Joseph Lawson (disambiguation), several people, including
 Joseph Lawson (cricketer) (1893–1969), English cricketer who played one first-class match for Gloucestershire
 Joseph Lawson (trainer) (1881–1964), British racehorse trainer
 Joseph William Lawson (1844–1920), English organist and composer
 Paul Lawson (disambiguation), several people, including
 Paul Lawson (boxer) (born 1966), British boxer
 Paul Lawson (footballer) (born 1984), Scottish footballer
 Paul M. Lawson (1914–1988), American politician
 Robert Lawson (disambiguation), several people, including
 Robert Lawson (architect), 19th century New Zealand architect
 Robert Lawson (author), writer and illustrator 
 Thomas Lawson (disambiguation), several people, including
 Thomas Lawson, fullback for the 2007 Nebraska Cornhuskers football team
 Thomas Lawson (artist) (born 1951), artist, writer and dean of California Institute of the Arts
 Thomas Lawson (military physician) (1789–1861), American military physician
 Thomas Lawson (botanist) (1630–1691), English botanist and Quaker
 E. Thomas Lawson, research scientist at the Institute of Cognition and Culture at Queen's University Belfast
 Thomas B. Lawson (1807–1888), American painter
 Thomas G. Lawson (1835–1912), U.S. Representative from Georgia
 Thomas J. Lawson (born 1957), Chief of the Defence Staff of the Canadian Armed Forces.
 Thomas R. Lawson, RPI Grand Marshal, 1897–1898
 Thomas W. Lawson (businessman) (1857–1925), American businessman and author
 William Lawson (disambiguation), several people, including
 William Lawson (banker) (1772–1848), Scottish businessman and politician
 William Lawson (co-operator) (1836–1916), co-operator and agriculturalist
 William Lawson (explorer) (1774–1850), explorer of New South Wales, Australia
 William Lawson (priest) (c.1554–1635), English cleric and writer on gardening
 William Lawson (speedway rider) (born 1987), former Scottish speedway rider

Lawson as given name
 Lawson D. Franklin (1804–1861), American planter, slave trader and businessman
 Lawson Harvey (1856–1920), Justice of the Indiana Supreme Court
 Lawson Sabah, Ghanaian footballer
 Lawson Wulsin, a psychiatrist and author

See also 
 Lawson (disambiguation)

English given names
English-language surnames
Surnames of English origin
Surnames of Scottish origin
Surnames of British Isles origin